Tre Isiah Jones (born January 8, 2000) is an American professional basketball player for the San Antonio Spurs of the National Basketball Association (NBA). He played college basketball for the Duke Blue Devils.

High school career
Jones played high school basketball for Apple Valley High School in Apple Valley, Minnesota. He joined the varsity team while in eighth grade and became a starter in his next season. Jones led Apple Valley to two Minnesota 4A state titles, in 2015 and 2017, and averaged 23.5 points, 10.4 rebounds, and 7.5 assists in the 2016–17 season. Jones left as a two-time Minnesota Gatorade Player of the Year and earned McDonald's All-American and Minnesota Mr. Basketball honors after his senior season.

Recruiting
By the end of his high school career, he was considered a five-star recruit and one of the best point guards in the 2018 class.

On August 13, 2017, he committed to play college basketball for Duke.

College career

Freshman season (2018–19)
Jones made his college debut for Duke on November 6, 2018, chipping in 6 points, 4 rebounds, and 7 assists in a 118–84 win over Kentucky at the Champions Classic. On December 20, he led his team to a 69–58 victory over Texas Tech, collecting 13 points, 5 rebounds, 5 assists, and 6 steals. Jones suffered a shoulder injury on January 14, 2019, during a collision with Frank Howard of Syracuse. He missed two games with the injury and returned on January 26 versus Georgia Tech. In his freshman season at Duke, Jones averaged 9.4 points, 5.3 assist, and 3.8 rebounds per game in 36 games for the Blue Devils.

Sophomore season (2019–20)
On April 8, 2019, it was announced Jones would return to Duke for the 2019–20 season. He scored 15 points in his sophomore debut, a 68–66 win over Kansas. Jones had a career-high 31 points in a 74–63 win over Georgia State on November 15. Jones missed games against Wofford and Brown in late December with a mild foot injury. At the conclusion of the regular season, Jones was named ACC Player of the Year and Defensive Player of the Year. Jones averaged 16.2 points, 6.4 assists, 4.2 rebounds, and 1.8 steals per game as a sophomore. After the season, Jones declared for the 2020 NBA draft.

Professional career

San Antonio Spurs (2020–present)
Jones was selected by the San Antonio Spurs with the 41st pick overall in the 2020 NBA draft which was hosted on November 18, 2020. On November 27, Jones signed with the Spurs. On February 1, 2021, Jones received his first assignment at G League.

National team career
Jones played for the United States at the 2015 FIBA Americas Under-16 Championship in Argentina, winning the gold medal. He recorded 19 steals in the competition, breaking the American under-16 record set by Malik Newman in 2013.

Career statistics

NBA

|-
| style="text-align:left;"| 2020–21
| style="text-align:left;"| San Antonio
| 37 || 1 || 7.3 || .474 || .600 || .895 || .6 || 1.1 || .2 || .0 || 2.5
|-
| style="text-align:left;"| 2021–22
| style="text-align:left;"| San Antonio
| 69 || 11 || 16.6 || .490 || .196 || .780 || 2.2 || 3.4 || .6 || .1 || 6.0  
|- class="sortbottom"
| style="text-align:center;" colspan="2"| Career
| 106 || 12 || 13.4 || .487 || .232 || .800 || 1.7 || 2.6 || .5 || .1 || 4.8

College

|-
| style="text-align:left;"| 2018–19
| style="text-align:left;"| Duke
| 36 || 36 || 34.2 || .414 || .262 || .758 || 3.8 || 5.3 || 1.9 || .2 || 11.6
|-
| style="text-align:left;"| 2019–20
| style="text-align:left;"| Duke
| 29 || 29 || 35.4 || .423 || .361 || .771 || 4.2 || 6.4 || 1.8 || .3 || 16.2
|- class="sortbottom"
| style="text-align:center;" colspan="2"| Career
| 65 || 65 || 34.7 || .419 || .313 || .767 || 4.0 || 5.8 || 1.85|| .2 || 13.9

Personal life
Jones has three older brothers: Tyus was a former NCAA champion with Duke and now plays for the Memphis Grizzlies of the National Basketball Association (NBA), while Jadee played college basketball for Furman before becoming a basketball coach at Apple Valley High School, additionally Tre has a half brother Reggie Bunch that played at Robert Morris University. His grandfather, Dennis Deutsch, was a member of the United States Armed Forces.

References

External links
Duke Blue Devils bio
USA Basketball bio

2000 births
Living people
20th-century African-American sportspeople
21st-century African-American sportspeople
African-American basketball players
All-American college men's basketball players
American men's basketball players
Apple Valley High School (Minnesota) alumni
Austin Spurs players
Basketball players from Minnesota
Duke Blue Devils men's basketball players
McDonald's High School All-Americans
People from Burnsville, Minnesota
Point guards
San Antonio Spurs draft picks
San Antonio Spurs players
Sportspeople from the Minneapolis–Saint Paul metropolitan area